Phan Kế An (20 March 1923 – 21 January 2018), also known under the pseudonym Phan Kích, was a Vietnamese painter and renowned lacquer artist. He was the son of Phan Kế Toại (1892–1973) who was the personal envoy to Tonkin of the last Emperor of Vietnam, Bảo Đại, the Minister of Home Affairs (1945-1955) and former deputy prime minister of North Vietnam from 1955-1973.

Early life and career 
Phan Kế An studied at Bưởi school under famous teachers such as Lê Thị Lựu, Tô Ngọc Vân, and Nguyễn Tường Lân.
He enrolled into the École des Beaux Arts de l'Indochine in 1944, but then joined the Việt Minh guerrillas before graduating along with many other artists from his class. He was tasked with drawing anti-colonial caricatures on walls in French occupied territory.

In 1947, at 24 years-old, he was asked by General Secretary, Trường Chinh, to join Sự Thật newspaper (the predecessor of Nhân Dân newspaper). In his role as commissioning editor, An drew political cartoons aimed at French, and later American, imperialism, as well as Ngô Đình Diệm's Republic of Vietnam government. He continued painting throughout the Vietnam War to criticize the American bombing of Hanoi.

In November 1948 he spent 3 weeks with Hồ Chí Minh and his advisers in the Việt Bắc, producing 20 portraits, which were later published in the Sự Thật (The Truth) newspaper.  An used many improvised materials to create these sketches and portraits, including the burnt ends of cigarette butts. He used charcoal to sketch Hồ Chí Minh at Work in the Việt Bắc. He was the first artist to depict Hồ Chí Minh during the First Indochina War. According to An, early works of communist leaders and soldiers were created to show support of the Việt Minh revolution, and risked severe punishment, even execution, if caught by French officials.

In the winter of 1950, as a special envoy for the Việt Minh, his painting Remembering the Northwest/Remember One the Northwest (Nhớ Một Chiều Tây Bắc), quickly established him as a renowned lacquer artist. The image was later immortalized by poet Đoàn Việt Bắc in his poem of the same name and was later accompanied by music from the composer Vũ Thành.

Phan Kế An's art works were part of the Realism in Asian Art exhibition co-organized by The National Art Gallery, Singapore and at the National Museum of Contemporary Art, Korea in 2010.

He died at the age of 94 on 21 January 2018 in Hanoi.

Collections 
Phan Kế An's works are part of a number of Vietnamese and international collections:

 Vietnam Fine Art Museum, Hanoi, Vietnam
 Ho Chi Minh Fine Arts Museum, Ho Chi Minh City, Vietnam
 State Museum of Oriental Art, Moscow, Russia
 Witness Collection, Penang, Malaysia

Official roles 
During his career, An held a number of official positions:

 Member of the Central Art Committee, 1951-1957
 Member of the Vietnam Fine Arts Association, 1957
 Deputy General Secretary of the Vietnam Fine Arts Association, 1958-1978 
 Member of Executive Committee of the Vietnam Fine Arts Association, 1957-1983.
 Member of the Executive Board, Member of the Professional Committee, Chairman of the Artistic Council of Graphic Design II Vietnam Association of Fine Arts, 1983-1989
 Member of the Vietnam Fine Arts Association Examination Board III, 1989-1994

Notable works
 Trời giông trên thành Thanh Hoá (Thunderstorm Looms over Thanh Hoá Citadel). First prize in the first National Fine Art Exhibition in Hanoi in 1946
 Hồ Chí Minh at Work in the Việt Bắc, 1948
 Nhớ Một Chiều Tây Bắc (Remembering the Northwest/Remember One the Northwest), 1950
Hanoi Christmas Bombing of 1972, Hanoi, 1975-1985

Awards 

 Third Class Independence Medal
 Second-Class Resistance Medal
 Anti-American Resistance Medal First Class
 Arts Devotion medal
 Medal for the cause of Vietnamese art
 Medal for the People's cause
 State Awards for Literature and Arts, 2001

See also 
 École des Beaux Arts de l'Indochine
 Việt Minh
 Hồ Chí Minh
 Vietnamese Art

References

Further reading 
Realism in Asian Art, 2010, The National Art Gallery, Singapore & The National Gallery of Contemporary Art, Korea
Hội Mỹ Thuật Việt Nam, Nghệ sĩ tạo hình Việt Nam hiện đại (Ký Hệu Hội Viên), 2009, Nhà Xuất Bản Mỹ Thuật, Hà Nội
Vietnam 1954-1975: War Drawings and Posters From The Ambassador Dato’ N. Parameswaran Collection, 2015, National University of Singapore Museum, Singapore

External links 
Vietnam Fine Art Museum
Witness Collection
Vietnam: The Art of War

Vietnamese painters
1923 births
2018 deaths
People from Hà Tĩnh province